Creative Vibes was a record label that sourced, signed and released local Australian acts. It also licensed material from overseas and imported CDs and vinyl from around the world and had its own sales and distribution arm.

Creative Vibes was nominated for 'Best Independent Label' at the Australian Dance Music Awards (DMA's), between 2000 and 2004, winning the award in 2000 and 2002.

A number of Creative Vibes artists have been nominated for ARIA Awards including Gotye (2006 - 'Best Independent Release' : Like Drawing Blood; 2007 - 'Best Dance Release', 'Best Independent Release', 'Album of the Year' & 'Best Male Artist': Mixed Blood), James Muller (2006 - 'Best Jazz Artist' : Kaboom), Mike Nock & Dave Liebman (2007 – 'Best Jazz Album' : Duologue), Joseph And James Tawadros (2006 - 'Best World Album' : Visions). At the 2006 AIR Chart Awards Gotye's album Like Drawing Blood won 'Most Outstanding Independent Artist' and in 2007 Mixed Blood was nominated 'Best Independent Artist'.

In December 2008, the label announced it was ceasing operations. They said "We're hugely proud of the work we've done over the past decade and a half.  Sadly though, as a truly independent company we just can't compete with large companies and multinational companies supplying everything from music to computers and electrical items, to give retailers what they now need to stay in business and sell good music at the same time."

Artists 
 Alphamama
 Bitrok
 Cosmo Jarvis
Def Wish Cast
 DJ Soup
 Ellesquire
 Enola Fall
 Feline Down
Gotye
 Laneous & the Family Yah
 Master of Ribongia (signed to October Records in 2014)
 M.S.D.
 Pear & the Awkward Orchestra
 Rockets
 Teinne
The Bird
 The Upskirts
 True Vibenation

See also
 List of record labels

References

External links
 

Australian independent record labels
Indie rock record labels
Record labels established in 1994
Record labels disestablished in 2008